Alan José Liebeskind Díaz (born 7 January 1985) is a Venezuelan international footballer who plays for the Mineros de Guayana, as a goalkeeper.

Club career
Born in Puerto Ordaz, Liebeskind has played club football for Caracas FC, Zamora FC, Deportivo Italia, Deportivo Petare, ACD Lara and Portuguesa FC.

International career
He made his international debut for Venezuela in 2011.

References

1985 births
Living people
Venezuelan footballers
Venezuela international footballers
Caracas FC players
Zamora FC players
Deportivo Italia players
Deportivo Miranda F.C. players
Asociación Civil Deportivo Lara players
Portuguesa F.C. players
Deportivo Táchira F.C. players
Association football goalkeepers
People from Ciudad Guayana